Devario fangae is a species of small cyprinid fish endemic to Myanmar.

Devario fangae was described by the Swedish ichthyologist Sven Kullander in 2017 from specimens collected in previous years from small streams which drained into the Mali River, a tributary of the Ayeyarwaddy River in the area around Putao in the extreme north of Kachin State in Myanmar. It appears to be closely related to Devario browni and to D. kakhienensis but is distinguished from them by the dark stripe along the middle of the side of the body being wider than the adjacent paler coloured stripes on either side. The specific name is in memory of the late Fang Fang Kullander (1962–2010), who collected the first specimens and who suggested they may represent a new species in honour of her contribution to knowledge of the freshwater fish fauna of Myanmar.

References

Devario
Cyprinid fish of Asia
Fish of Myanmar
Endemic fauna of Myanmar
Fish described in 2017
Taxa named by Sven O. Kullander